Senator Halligan may refer to:

Brendan Halligan (1936–2020), Seanad Éireann, Republic of Ireland
Jim Halligan (born 1936), Oklahoma State Senate, USA
Mike Halligan (born 1949), Montana State Senate, USA

See also

 Halligan (disambiguation)
 Senator (disambiguation)